Yadrian Escobar Silva (born July 12, 1988) is a Cuban volleyball player, a member of the club Ziraat Bankası Ankara.

Sporting achievements

Clubs 
Qatar Cup:
  2015
Argentina Championship:
  2019

Individual
 2014–15 Brazilian Superliga – Best Scorer
 2015–16 Brazilian Superliga – Best Scorer

References

External links
 ACLAV profile
 Volleybox profile
 ACLAV-Web.DataProject profile

1988 births
Living people
Cuban men's volleyball players
Expatriate volleyball players in Brazil
Cuban expatriates in Brazil
Expatriate volleyball players in Qatar
Cuban expatriates in Qatar
Expatriate volleyball players in Japan
Cuban expatriates in Japan
Cuban expatriates in Argentina
Expatriate volleyball players in Turkey
Cuban expatriate sportspeople in Turkey